Worth It is an American entertainment web series by BuzzFeed that premiered on September 18, 2016. In addition to the main show, there have been several spin-off series and related content.

Episodes

Season 1 (2016–2017)

Season 2 (2017)

Season 3 (2017–2018)

Season 4 (2018)

Season 5 (2018)

Season 6 (2019)

Season 7 (2019)

Season 8 (2020)

Worth It: One Stop

Worth It: Social Distancing Edition

Worth It: About To Eat — 2021

Worth It: About To Eat — 2022

Worth It: About To Eat — 2023

Worth It: Lifestyle Episodes

Season 1 (2017)

Season 2 (2017)

Season 3 (2018)

Season 4 (2019)

Worth It: UK Episodes

Season 1 (2017)

References 

BuzzFeed
YouTube original programming
Lists of American non-fiction television series episodes